Kimberley Zimmermann (born 9 November 1995) is a Belgian tennis player.
Zimmermann has a career-high singles ranking of world No. 215, achieved on 13 May 2019. On 6 March 2023, she reached her highest WTA doubles ranking of No. 37. She has won two doubles titles on the WTA Tour and one doubles title on WTA 125 tournaments along with two singles and 18 doubles titles on tournaments of the ITF Women's Circuit.

Career
Zimmermann won her first WTA Tour title in July 2021 at the Palermo Ladies Open, in the doubles event, partnering Erin Routliffe and defended her title the  following year partnering with Anna Bondar.

Family
Kimberley Zimmermann is the daughter of Michel Zimmermann, men's 400 metres hurdles' finalist at the 1984 Summer Olympics.

Performance timelines

Doubles

WTA career finals

Doubles: 4 (2 titles, 2 runner-ups)

WTA Challenger finals

Doubles: 1 (title)

ITF Circuit finals

Singles: 4 (2 titles, 2 runner–ups)

Doubles: 40 (18 titles, 22 runner–ups)

Notes

References

External links
 
 

1995 births
Living people
Belgian female tennis players
21st-century Belgian women